There are a small number of $200 banknotes:

 One of the Nicaraguan córdoba banknotes
 One of the fifth series of the New Taiwan Dollar banknote

See also
 Fake denominations of United States currency